The First and True Home of Asianovelas is a programming block of ABS-CBN composed of Filipino-dubbed Asian dramas. On May 5, 2003, Meteor Garden was the first Asian drama aired on the network. The Asian drama block dissolved on May 5, 2020 after ABS-CBN ceased its free-to-air broadcast operations as ordered by the National Telecommunications Commission (NTC) and former Solicitor General Jose Calida. On July 10, 2020, the Philippine House Committee of 18th Congress denied the network's franchise renewal.

Most of the acquired dramas by the network are now expired and no longer holds the legitimate rights to air them. The network continues to air Asian dramas on other platforms in a limited capacity.

History

ABS-CBN off air and Asianovela Channel resumed its operations on June 1, 2020, until the channel permanently ceased broadcasting on June 30 due to the NTC's alias cease-and-desist order (ACDO) against ABS-CBN TV Plus and all of its digital channels transmitted through Channel 43 frequency. The NTC, headed by Gamaliel Cordoba, was pressured by the House of Representatives of 18th Congress (led by Alan Peter Cayetano, Rodante Marcoleta, Mike Defensor, Elpidio Barzaga Jr., Jesus Crispin "Boying" Remulla, and many more) who are all against the franchise renewal of ABS-CBN. The NTC finally recalled all the frequencies and channels assigned to ABS-CBN after the franchise renewal has since denied by the House Committee on Legislative Franchises. In January 2022, the NTC have transferred all the defunct frequencies of ABS-CBN and Asianovela Channel to Manny Villar's Advanced Media Broadcasting System (All TV) and Apollo Quiboloy's Swara Sug Media Corporation (Sonshine Media Network International) respectively, the asian drama block continues to broadcast on its ad-interim replacement Kapamilya Channel and blocktime agreements to other networks.

Previous programs
Note: The following is a list of Asian dramas that originally aired first on each platforms. Reruns are excluded in this section.

ABS-CBN (defunct)

 Meteor Garden 
 Meteor Rain 
 Meteor Garden II 
 Love Scar 
 Girls Marching On 
 Eternity: A Chinese Ghost Story 
 The Truth 
 Westside Story 
 Fantasy 
 Four Sisters 
 Sunshine of Love 
 Love in the City 
 First Love 
 The Promise 
 Feel 100% 
 Lovers in Paris 
 Farewell Firefly 
 Save the Last Dance for Me 
 Memories of Bali 
 Stained Glass 
 Oh Feel Young 
 Green Rose 
 101st Proposal 
 Amazing Twins 
 Only You 
 Forbidden Love 
 Outstanding Twins 
 Spring Day 
 Princess Lulu 
 Wedding 
 Wonderful Life 
 Eternal Love 
 My Girl 
 A Love to Kill 
 It Started with a Kiss 
 Princess Hours 
 Something About 1% 
 Which Star Are You From 
 Spring Waltz 
 Wanted: Perfect Husband 
 Marrying a Millionaire 
 Hana Kimi 
 Lovers 
 Romantic Princess 
 Artificial Beauty 
 They Kiss Again 
 Three Dads with One Mommy 
 Basketball Tribe 
 Why Why Love 
 Precious Time 
 Mischievous Princess 
 Hot Shot 
 Boys Over Flowers 
 Love or Bread 
 Miss No Good 
 Honey Watch Out! 
 He's Beautiful 
 Down with Love 
 Perfect Match 
 Cinderella's Sister 
 I Love You So, Autumn's Concerto 
 My Princess 
 I Am Legend 
 My Girlfriend Is a Gumiho 
 Marry Me, Mary! 
 Pure Love 
 The Fierce Wife 
 My Fair Lady 
 Three Brothers 
 Helena's Promise 
 Heartstrings 
 City Hunter 
 Dream High 
 Two Wives 
 Equator Man 
 Secret Love: Sungkyunkwan Scandal 
 A Gentleman's Dignity 
 Rooftop Prince 
 You're Still the One 
 Ohlala Couple 
 Glory Jane 
 To the Beautiful You 
 Missing You 
 A Promise of a Thousand Days 
 Absolute Boyfriend 
 Love Rain 
 That Winter, the Wind Blows 
 The Love Story of Kang Chi 
 Wish Upon a Star 
 Crazy Love 
 When a Man Falls in Love 
 Skip Beat! 
 The Heirs 
 Pretty Man 
 Miss Ripley 
 Angel Eyes 
 Angel Wings 
 Fated to Love You 
 Unforgettable Love 
 My Lovely Girl 
 Let's Get Married 
 My Love Donna 
 Love in the Moonlight 
 Goblin 
 Legend of the Blue Sea 
 Weightlifting Fairy 
 My Dearest Intruder 
 Hwarang 
 Black 
 The King Is in Love 
 I am Not a Robot 
 W 
 A Love So Beautiful 
 Doctor Crush 
 Go Back Couple 
 Hwayugi: A Korean Odyssey 
 My Time with You 
 Meteor Garden (2018 version) 
 What's Wrong with Secretary Kim 
 Encounter 
 Gangnam Beauty 
 Codename: Terrius 
 100 Days My Prince 
 I Have a Lover 
 Hotel del Luna 
 Touch Your Heart 
 Flower Crew: Dating Agency 
 Story of Yanxi Palace 
 The Tale of Nokdu 
 Love in Sadness

ABS-CBN Mobile (defunct)
 Faith

Asianovela Channel (defunct)

 Bubble Gum 
 High Society 
 On the Way to the Airport 
 Uncontrollably Fond 
 Woman with a Suitcase 
 Because This Is My First Life 
 Cheongdam-dong Scandal 
 Goodbye Mr. Black 
 Hana Nochi Hare 
 Mama Fairy and the Woodcutter 
 Mother 
 Something in the Rain 
 That Man Oh Soo 
 The Good Wife 
 Tomorrow, with You 
 Two Cops 
 Live Up to Your Name

CineMo! (former)

 Blade Man 
 Blood 
 Orange Marmalade 
 You're All Surrounded 
 Doctor Stranger 
 Hyde, Jekyll, Me 
 Sensory Couple 
 Signal 
 The K2

iWantTFC

 2gether: The Series 
 Still 2gether 
 Come To Me 
 I'm Tee, Me Too 
 Dark Blue Kiss 
 Theory of Love 
 The Shipper 
 A Tale of Thousand Stars 
 Count Your Lucky Stars 
 Bad Buddy 
 Baker Boys 
 Not Me 
 F4 Thailand: Boys Over Flowers 
 Enchanté

Jeepney TV

 I'll Still Love You Ten Years from Now 
 Protect the Boss 
 Asuko March 
 Fukuoka Love Stories 
 He's Beautiful (Japanese version) 
 Partners by Blood 
 The Thorn Birds 
 Winter Sonata 
 Good Doctor 
 Starman 
 Cheongdam-dong Alice 
 Cunning Single Lady 
 Emergency Couple 
 It's Okay, That's Love 
 Twenty Again 
 Heard It Through The Grapevine 
 Mask 
 Oh! My Lady 
 Warm and Cozy

Kapamilya Channel

 The World of a Married Couple 
 Familiar Wife 
 2gether The Series 
 Still 2gether 
 Suits 
 Criminal Minds 
 Meow, The Secret Boy 
 Melting Me Softly 
 F4 Thailand: Boys Over Flowers 
 Come and Hug Me 
 Ever Night: War of Brilliant Splendours

Studio 23 (defunct)

 Butterfly Fly Fly 
 Fireworks 
 Smile Again 
 White Tower 
 Honey and Clover 
 KO One 
 Prince Hours 
 Chu, Chu, My Daddy 
 Dream 
 Love at First Fight 
 Rolling Love 
 Summer X Summer 
 The X-Family

References

2003 establishments in the Philippines
2020 disestablishments in the Philippines
South Korean television series
Television programming blocks